The Hurley School District is a school district located in Kimball, Wisconsin, serving the area around the city of Hurley in the northern portions of Iron County, Wisconsin. 

The school district consists of a single school building, the Hurley K-12 School, located on Range View Drive. This structure is divided into an elementary school, middle school, high school and the Dr. Joseph Lalich Charter School. The $7 million Hurley K-12 School was originally built in 1991 to combine the J.E. Murphy High School, South Side Elementary and St. Mary's Catholic School all in Hurley, and Roosevelt Elementary School in Montreal.

The school mascot was the Midget until early 2019, when after a community search the teams were renamed the Northstars. and its colors are Orange and Black. In 1995, the Midgets football team appeared in the WIAA's Division 5 state championship, losing to Darlington with a score of 63–6.

In August 2006, the district's five-member school board unanimously agreed that the school grounds should be annexed to the City of Hurley.

Areas served by the Hurley School District
City of Hurley
City of Montreal
Carey 
Gile 
Gurney 
Iron Belt
Oma
Pence
Saxon
Upson

References

External links
Hurley School District

School districts in Wisconsin
Education in Iron County, Wisconsin